50 Cancri is a single star in the zodiac constellation of Cancer, located 183 light years away from the Sun. It has the Bayer designation A2 Cancri; 50 Cancri is the Flamsteed designation. It is faintly visible to the naked eye as a white-hued star with an apparent visual magnitude of 5.89. The star is moving away from the Earth with a heliocentric radial velocity of 23 km/s, having come to within  some 1.2 million years ago.

This is a chemically peculiar A-type main-sequence star with a stellar classification of A1 Vp. It is a Lambda Boötis star displaying strongly-depleted iron peak and alpha process elements, but otherwise relatively normal solar abundances. The star shows no variability down to a detection limit of 1.6 millimagnitudes. It is 264 million years old with a relatively low projected rotational velocity of 18 km/s. 50 Cancri has 2.1 times the mass of the Sun and is radiating 11 times the Sun's luminosity from its photosphere at an effective temperature of 8,340 K.

50 Cancri has an infrared excess, which most likely indicates a debris disk in orbit around the host star.

References

A-type main-sequence stars
Lambda Boötis stars
Cancer (constellation)
Cancri, A2
BD+12 1904
Cancri, 50
074873
3481
043121